Lars Hård is a 1948 Swedish drama film directed by Hampe Faustman and starring George Fant, Adolf Jahr and Eva Dahlbeck. It was shot at the Centrumateljéerna Studios in Stockholm. The film's sets were designed by the art director P.A. Lundgren.

Cast

 George Fant as Lars Johan Hård
 Adolf Jahr as 	Lars' Father
 Elsa Widborg as 	Lars' Mother
 Eva Dahlbeck as 	Inga
 Ulla Smidje as 	Maj
 Nine-Christine Jönsson as Eva
 Rut Holm as Coachman's Wife
 Torsten Bergström as 	The Coachman
 Hugo Björne as 	Sundvall - Chimney Sweep
 Carl Ström as 	Friendly Prison Guard
 Hampe Faustman as 	Prison Reverend
 Tord Bernheim as Guard at Penal Labour Prison
 Sif Ruud as 	Child Welfare Officer
 Ann Mari Uddenberg as 	Marta 
 Artur Rolén as 	Andersson
 Gustaf Lövås as 	Prisoner 
 Axel Högel as 	Older Prisoner
 Josua Bengtson as 	Åhs - Prisoner
 Arne Källerud as 	Oskar
 David Erikson as 	Prisoner 
 Sten Lindgren as Prison Port Guard
 Åke Fridell as 	Sadistic Prison Guard
 Tekla Sjöblom as	Old Peasant Woman
 Ivar Wahlgren as 	Constable
 Lars Ekborg as 	Peasant Woman's Son
 Nils Ekman as 	Farm-hand 
 Inga Gill as Maid 
 Gösta Gustafson as Prisoner
 Gösta Holmström as 	Lieutenant 
 Nils Hultgren as 	Lawman 
 Hugo Jacobsson as Prison Guard 
 Stig Johanson as Farm-hand 
 Eric Laurent as Police Officer 
 Birger Lensander as 	Released Prisoner 
 Wilma Malmlöf as 	Praying Woman 
 John Norrman as Prisoner 
 Aurore Palmgren as 	Old Woman on the Road 
 Olav Riégo as 	Prison Director 
 Hanny Schedin s Praying Woman 
 Georg Skarstedt as 	Farm-hand 
 Tord Stål as 	Judge

References

Bibliography 
 Sundholm, John. Historical Dictionary of Scandinavian Cinema. Scarecrow Press, 2012.

External links 
 

1948 films
Swedish drama films
1948 drama films
1940s Swedish-language films
Films directed by Hampe Faustman
Films based on Swedish novels
1940s Swedish films